Ultimate Pro Wrestling (UPW) was a California-based independent pro wrestling company owned and operated by Rick Bassman, that operated from 1999 to 2007.

The company had working relationships with Pro Wrestling Zero1 and World Wrestling Entertainment. It served as a developmental company for WWE, where they would scout wrestlers and send others for training, from 2006 to 2007. Some of the major names to go on to stardom are, John Cena, Samoa Joe, The Miz and Christopher Daniels. The promotion was featured on a Discovery Channel special called Inside Pro Wrestling School.

Notable alumni 
Deceased individuals are indicated with a dagger (†). 
 Melina Perez/Kyra
 Rick Bassman
 B-Boy
 Mike Bell †
 The Blue Meanie
 Jack Bull
 Cheerleader Melissa
 Christian
 Melissa Coates †
 Steve Corino
 Christopher Daniels
 Tommy Dreamer
 Edge
 Scott Hall †
 Head Bitch in Charge
 Jon Heidenreich
 Molly Holly
 Horshu
 Tom Howard
 Ivory
 Tony Jones
 Evan Karagias
 Al Katrazz
 Frankie Kazarian
 Mike Knox
 Konnan
 Paul London
 Scott Lost
 Jerry Lynn
 Juventud Guerrera
 The Miz
 Michael Modest
 Donovan Morgan
 Chris Mordetzky
 Kevin Nash
 Nova
 Sean O'Haire †
 Human Tornado
 Shinjiro Otani
 Diamond Dallas Page
 Chuck Palumbo
 Adam Pearce
 The Prototype (John Cena)
 Psicosis
 Daniel Puder
 Tyler Reks
 Puma
 Quicksilver
 Road Warrior Animal †
 Road Warrior Hawk †
 Ricky Reyes
 Davey Richards
 Rikishi
 Rocky Romero
 Ruckus
 Joey Ryan
 Keiji Sakoda
 Samoa Joe
 Scorpio Sky
 Skulu †
 Babi Slymm
 Ken Shamrock
 Bison Smith
 Spanky
 Jimmy Snuka
 Solo Snuka
 Masato Tanaka
 Sylvester Terkay
 Rob Van Dam
 Brett Wagner
 Tommy Drake

Tag Teams:
 The Ballard Brothers (Shane and Shannon) and Cheerleader Melissa
 Los Cubanitos (Ricky Reyes and Rocky Romero)
 Edge and Christian
 Evolution (Frankie Kazarian and Nova)
 Hardkore Inc. (Adam Pearce, Hardkore Kidd, and Al Katrazz)
 Kevin Nash and Scott Hall
 The Road Warriors (Hawk and Animal)
 Chuck Palumbo and Sean O'Haire
 Team Emblem (Keiji Sakoda, Masato Tanaka, and Shinjiro Otani)

Championships 

 UPW Heavyweight Championship
 UPW Lightweight Championship
 UPW Tag Team Championship
 UPW Southern California/Shoot Championship
 UPW No Holds Barred Championship
 NWA/UPW/Zero1 International Junior Heavyweight Championship

UPW Heavyweight Championship 
The UPW Heavyweight Championship was a championship contested for by Heavyweight wrestlers in Ultimate Pro Wrestling.

UPW Lightweight Championship 
The UPW Lightweight Championship was a championship contested for by Cruiserweight wrestlers in Ultimate Pro Wrestling.

UPW Tag Team Championship 
The UPW Tag Team Championship was a secondary title contested for in Ultimate Pro Wrestling.

UPW Southern California Heavyweight Championship 
The UPW Southern California Heavyweight Championship was a secondary title contested for in Ultimate Pro Wrestling.

UPW No Holds Barred Championship 
The UPW No Holds Barred Championship was a secondary title contested for in Ultimate Pro Wrestling.

UPW Internet Championship 
The UPW Internet Championship was a secondary title contested for in Ultimate Pro Wrestling.

UPW Women's Championship

See also
List of independent wrestling promotions in the United States

References

External links 
 www.wrestling-titles.com/us/ca/s/upw
 www.onlineworldofwrestling.com/results/upw

Pro Wrestling Zero1
Sports in California
Independent professional wrestling promotions based in California
WWE